The Genesis Code is a 2010 Christian American drama film directed by C. Thomas Howell and Patrick Read Johnson, and written by Michael W. Leighton.

Plot
Kerry Wells (Kelsey Sanders), a college student journalist and committed Christian, has been assigned to do a story on Blake Truman (Logan Bartholomew), the college's hockey superstar. Blake struggles with personal crisis but rejects Kerry's reliance on her faith. He is convinced that modern science has disproved the Bible and especially the Genesis story of creation. Together they discover that the creation story and science may be in perfect accord.

The Genesis Code takes on two current social and cultural issues: Evolution vs. creation and end-of-life decisions. Although this becomes a romance story, it gives a look to the age-old question of how science and a book of the Bible, Genesis, may both be correct and told in a format that a normal layperson will understand.

Cast
 Logan Bartholomew as Blake Truman
 Kelsey Sanders as Kerry Wells
 Jerry Zandstra as Reverend Wells
 C.R. Lewis as Shane Thomas
 Ernest Borgnine as Carl Taylor
 Louise Fletcher as Ellen Taylor
 Fred Dalton Thompson as Judge Hardin
 Lance Henriksen as Dr. Hoffer
 Rance Howard as Dr. Tolley
 Ben Murphy as Professor Campbell
 Catherine Hicks as Myra Allitt
 Susan Blakely as Beverly Truman
 Rich Franklin as Coach Edwards
 Adam Chambers as Marc Wells
 Lauren Mae Shafer as Rita

Production
The first director, Patrick Read Johnson, was fired and C. Thomas Howell was brought in to finish the film. Director Guild of America rules required that Johnson be given a shared credit. The film was shot in Grand Rapids, Michigan and
Lowell, Michigan.

Release
The Genesis Code premiered in the United States on 25 August 2010 as part of the Grand Rapids Film Festival.

The film was released on home video on 6 March 2012 in North America.

References

External links
 
 Official site

2010 films
Films directed by C. Thomas Howell
2010 drama films
American drama films
Films directed by Patrick Read Johnson
2010s English-language films
2010s American films